Judith Michael is the pseudonym of the husband-and-wife writing team of Judith Barnard (born 1934) and Michael Fain (born 1937). Barnard has worked as a journalist, educational film writer, biographer and editor. She received a B.A. from Ohio State University and an M.A. from Northwestern University. Under her own name, she wrote the novel The Past and Present of Solomon Sorge (1967). Fain has worked as an engineer for NASA, was president of an electronics company in Canada, and published numerous scientific articles under his own name. Jointly, under their two names, Barnard and Fain published articles on marriage and the family in Redbook, Reader's Digest, and Ladies' Home Journal, among others. As Judith Michael, they published eleven highly successful contemporary novels.

Bibliography

as Judith Barnard 
 The Past and Present of Solomon Sorge (1967)
Crooked Branches on the Family Tree (2018)

as Judith Michael 
 Deceptions (1982)
 Possessions (1984)
 Private Affairs (1986)
 Inheritance (1988)
 A Ruling Passion (1990)
 Sleeping Beauty (1991)
 Pot of Gold (1993)
 A Tangled Web (1994)
 Acts of Love (1997)
 A Certain Smile (1999)
 The Real Mother (2005)

References
 "Judith Barnard", Contemporary Authors Online, Thompson Gale, entry updated 13 February 2001

20th-century American novelists
21st-century American novelists
American women novelists
Collective pseudonyms
Living people
1934 births
1937 births
Ohio State University alumni
Northwestern University alumni
20th-century American women writers
21st-century American women writers